Norton County may refer to:

 Norton County, Kansas, a county located in the U.S. state of Kansas
 Norton County (meteorite), a meteorite fell in Kansas in 1948